Maxwell Bodenheim (May 26, 1892 – February 6, 1954) was an American poet and novelist.  A literary figure in Chicago, he later went to New York where he became known as the King of Greenwich Village Bohemians. His writing brought him international notoriety during the Jazz Age of the 1920s.

Biography
Born Maxwell Bodenheimer in Hermanville, Mississippi, he was the son of Solomon Bodenheimer (born July 1858) and Carrie (born April 1860). His father was born in Germany and his mother in Alsace-Lorraine. Carrie emigrated to the United States in 1881 and Solomon in 1888. In 1900, the family moved from Mississippi to Chicago. The Federal census gave their residence as 431 46th Street .

Bodenheim and writer Ben Hecht met in Chicago and became literary friends about 1912. (At the time, Bodenheim was nicknamed "Bogey." The nickname was also applied in his later years in Greenwich Village.) They co-founded The Chicago Literary Times (1923–1924). Contributors included Carl Sandburg, Theodore Dreiser, Edgar Lee Masters, Witter Bynner, Arthur Davison Ficke, Floyd Dell, Vachel Lindsay and Sherwood Anderson.

For many years a leading figure of the Bohemian scene in New York's Greenwich Village, Bodenheim deteriorated rapidly after his success in the 1920s and 1930s. Before he married his second wife, Grace, he had become a panhandler. They spent part of their marriage in the Catskills. After she died of cancer, he was arrested and hospitalized several times for vagrancy and drunkenness .

Critic John Strausbaugh suggests that Bodenheim had "a real talent for scandal, easy enough to generate during Greenwich Village's prolonged drunken orgy in the Prohibition years." Strausbaugh notes that Bodenheim's "haughty, insulting demeanor, and his habit of trying to steal other men's women right under their noses, got him regularly socked on the jaw and thrown out of bars, soirees and the fauxhemian revels at Webster Hall."

Work

Bodenheim published his earliest verse in the groundbreaking Poetry magazine in 1914. A poem by Bodenheim was featured in the 1917 Others: An Anthology of the New Verse, which included poems by such future luminaries as T. S. Eliot, Marianne Moore, Carl Sandburg, William Carlos Williams, and Wallace Stevens. While the poet was living in New York City, he became an active member of the Raven Poetry Circle of Greenwich Village.

Over the next ten years, he established himself as a leading American author, publishing ten books of verse, which incorporate many techniques of the imagists, and 13 novels. His poetry books include Minna and Myself (1918), Advice (1920), Against This Age (1923), The King of Spain (1928), Bringing Jazz! (1930) and Selected Poems 1914–1944 (1946).

Bodenheim's novels include Blackguard (1923), Replenishing Jessica (1925), Ninth Avenue (1926), Georgia May (1927), Naked on Roller Skates (1930) and A Virtuous Girl (1930).

Personal life and death
Bodenheim had three wives. His first wife was Minna Schein (married 1918-divorced 1938), with whom he had one son, Solbert, born 1920. His second wife was Grace Finan (married 1939-her death 1950). After becoming a widower, he married Ruth Fagin (married 1952-their deaths 1954).

Ruth, 28 years his junior, shared his derelict lifestyle. They were homeless and slept on park benches. He sometimes panhandled while carrying a sign that read, "I Am Blind," although he had adequate vision. He sometimes composed short poems for money or drinks. Ruth engaged in prostitution, which reportedly provoked beatings by her husband.

Bodenheim and Ruth were murdered February 6, 1954, at a flophouse at 97 Third Avenue in Manhattan, by a 25-year-old dishwasher, Harold "Charlie" Weinberg. They had befriended him on the streets of the Village and he offered to let them spend the night in his room a few blocks from the Bowery. Weinberg and Ruth had sex near the cot where the 62-year-old drunken Bodenheim appeared to be sleeping. Bodenheim arose, challenged Weinberg, and they began fighting. Weinberg shot Bodenheim twice in the chest. He beat Ruth and stabbed her four times in the back. Weinberg confessed to the double homicide, but said in his defense, "I ought to get a medal. I killed two Communists." Weinberg was judged insane (sociopathic) and sent to a mental institution.

Hecht offered to pay for Bodenheim's funeral. Bodenheim's ex-wife, Minna, made arrangements to have him buried in her family plot in Cedar Park Cemetery, Emerson, New Jersey.

The year before their murder, the Bodenheims had spent some time (perhaps two months) as guests of the Catholic Worker of Dorothy Day in New York.  Day had been a friend of Maxwell in Greenwich Village in the 1920s. She devoted a chapter to the Bodenheims in her Loaves and Fishes (1963).

Legacy
Bodenheim's memoir, My Life and Loves in Greenwich Village, released six months after his death in 1954, was largely ghostwritten by David George Plotkin, a writer employed by the publisher Samuel Roth. Roth had been paying the down-and-out Bodenheim for his biographical stories about Greenwich Village at the time of the writer's murder. 
Hecht based his 1958 play Winkelberg on the life of the bohemian poet.
Three official full biographies have been published on Maxwell Bodenheim: a doctoral dissertation by Edward T. Devoe, A Soul in Gaudy Tatters, University of Pennsylvania (1957); Maxwell Bodenheim (1970) by Jack B. Moore; and a doctoral dissertation, The Necessity of Rebellion: The Novels of Maxwell Bodenheim (1975) by Arthur B. Sacks, University of Wisconsin-Madison.

Selected works
 Minna and Myself, poetry, 1918
 Advice, poetry, 1920
 Introducing Irony, poetry, 1922
 Against This Age, poetry, 1923
 Blackguard, novel, 1923
 The Sardonic Arm, poetry, 1923
 Crazy Man, novel, 1924
 Replenishing Jessica, novel, 1925
 Ninth Avenue, novel, 1926
 Returning to Emotion, poetry, 1927
 Georgie May, novel, 1928
 The King of Spain, poetry, 1928
 Sixty Seconds, novel, 1929
 Bringing Jazz!, poetry, 1930
 Naked on Roller Skates, novel, 1930
 A Virtuous Girl, novel, 1930
 Duke Herring, novel, 1931
 Run, Sheep, Run, novel, 1932
 Six A.M., novel, 1932
 New York Madness, novel, 1933
 Slow Vision, novel, 1933
 Lights in the Valley, poetry, 1942
 Selected Poems, poetry, 1946
 My Life and Loves in Greenwich Village, 1954
 Cutie A Warm Mamma (Ben Hecht and Maxwell Bodenheim)

References

External links

 
 
 
Quoth the Raven Poetry Circle | "From the Stacks" at New-York Historical Society
Poems by Maxwell Bodenheim Extensive collection of Bodenheim's poetry

memoir of Max Bodenheim by Dorothy Day
Hervey Allen Papers, 1831-1965, SC.1952.01, Special Collections Department, University of Pittsburgh(Folder 22 contains Allen's correspondence with Bodenheim)
Michael Reid-Maxwell Bodenheim Collection at the Newberry Library

1892 births
1954 deaths
20th-century American male writers
20th-century American memoirists
20th-century American novelists
American humorous poets
American male non-fiction writers
American male novelists
American people of German descent
Beggars
Burials at Cedar Park Cemetery (Emerson, New Jersey)
Deaths by firearm in Manhattan
Federal Writers' Project people
Male murder victims
Novelists from Mississippi
People murdered in New York City